Robert Eugene McChesney (October 27, 1926 – December 19, 2002) was an American football offensive end who played two seasons with the New York Giants of the National Football League (NFL). He was drafted by the Philadelphia Eagles in the fourth round of the 1950 NFL Draft. He played college football at Hardin–Simmons University and attended Van Nuys High School with Marilyn Monroe in Los Angeles, California.

References

External links
Just Sports Stats

1926 births
2002 deaths
Players of American football from Los Angeles
American football ends
Hardin–Simmons Cowboys football players
New York Giants players
People from Granada Hills, Los Angeles